1948–49 was the forty-first occasion on which the  Yorkshire Cup competition had been held.

Bradford Northern won the trophy by beating Castleford by the score of 18-9

The match was played at Headingley, Leeds, now in West Yorkshire. The attendance was 31,393 and receipts were £5,053

The  first of two successive wins for Bradford Northern

Background 

This season, junior/amateur clubs Yorkshire Amateurs were again invited to take part and the  number of clubs who entered remained at the same as last season's total number of sixteen.

This in turn resulted in no byes in the first round.

The  competition again followed the  original formula of a knock-out tournament, with the  exception of the  first round which was still played on a two-legged home and away basis.

Competition and results

Round 1 – first leg 
Involved  8 matches (with no byes) and 16 clubs

All first round ties are played on a two-legged home and away basis

Round 1 – second leg  
Involved  8 matches (with no byes) and 16 clubs

All first round ties are played on a two-legged home and away basis

Round 2 - quarterfinals 
Involved 4 matches and 8 clubs

All second round ties are played on a knock-out basis

Round 3 – semifinals  
Involved 2 matches and 4 clubs

Both semi-final ties are played on a knock-out basis

Round 3 – semifinals  - Replay 
Involved 2 matches and 4 clubs

Both semi-final ties are played on a knock-out basis

Final

Teams and scorers 

Scoring - Try = three (3) points - Goal = two (2) points - Drop goal = two (2) points

The road to success 
All the ties in the  first round were played on a two leg (home and away) basis.

For the  first round ties, the first club named in each of the ties played the first leg at home.

For the  first round ties, the scores shown are the aggregate score over the two legs.

Notes and comments 
1 * Yorkshire Amateurs were a team from Yorkshire which appeared to have players selected from  many both professional and amateur clubs - can anyone comment ?    Yorkshire Amateurs played on many grounds, this match was played at Parkside, the  ground of Hunslet

2 * Headingley, Leeds, is the home ground of Leeds RLFC with a capacity of 21,000. The record attendance was  40,175 for a league match between Leeds and Bradford Northern on 21 May 1947.

General information for those unfamiliar 
The Rugby League Yorkshire Cup competition was a knock-out competition between (mainly professional) rugby league clubs from  the  county of Yorkshire. The actual area was at times increased to encompass other teams from  outside the  county such as Newcastle, Mansfield, Coventry, and even London (in the form of Acton & Willesden.

The Rugby League season always (until the onset of "Summer Rugby" in 1996) ran from around August-time through to around May-time and this competition always took place early in the season, in the Autumn, with the final taking place in (or just before) December (The only exception to this was when disruption of the fixture list was caused during, and immediately after, the two World Wars)

See also 
1948–49 Northern Rugby Football League season
Rugby league county cups

References

External links
Saints Heritage Society
1896–97 Northern Rugby Football Union season at wigan.rlfans.com
Hull&Proud Fixtures & Results 1896/1897
Widnes Vikings - One team, one passion Season In Review - 1896-97
The Northern Union at warringtonwolves.org

1948 in rugby league
1948 in English sport
RFL Yorkshire Cup